The 9th Kisei was the 9th edition of the Kisei tournament. Since Cho Chikun won the previous year, he is given an automatic place in the final. Eight players battled in a knockout tournament to decide the final 2. Those two would then play each other in a best-of-3 match to decide who would face Cho. Takemiya Masaki became the challenger after beating Kobayashi Koichi 2 games to 1, but lost to Cho 4 games to 3.

Tournament

Challenger finals

Finals

References 

Kisei (Go)
1985 in go